The Unidad de Fomento (UF) is a unit of account used in Chile. It is a non-circulating currency; the exchange rate between the UF and the Chilean peso is constantly adjusted for inflation so that the value of the Unidad de Fomento remains almost constant on a daily basis during low inflation. It was created on 20 January 1967, for the use in determining the principal and interest in international secured loans for development, subject to revaluation according to the variations of inflation. Afterwards it was extended to all types of bank loans, private or special financing, purchases and investments on instalments, contracts, and some special situations. It is also used in legal standards such as the par value of stock and capitalization of companies, and fines.

It has become the preferred and predominant measure to determine the cost of real estate, values of housing and any secured loan, either private or of the Chilean government. Individual payments are made in Chilean pesos (the country's legal tender), according to the daily value of the UF.

Calculation over time
From its creation in 1967, each calendar quarter, the UF value of 100 Chilean peso would be quoted based on the Consumer Price Index (CPI) of the past three months, which would be the official rate for the following quarter. In October 1975 with the currency changeover to pesos, the value of 1 UF was quoted in pesos and readjusted monthly. In July 1977 it was calculated daily by interpolation between the 10th of each month and the 9th of the following month, according to the monthly variation of the CPI. Since 1990 the Central Bank of Chile has determined its value. The values of the CPI are officially kept by the Instituto Nacional de Estadísticas de Chile (National Statistics Institute of Chile). Historical values of the UF as of 31 December each year (unlike below, in Chile numbers are written with a decimal comma and a dot to separate thousands):

See also
Constant Item Purchasing Power Accounting
Unidade Real de Valor
Indexed unit of account

External links 
Official historical and updated (UF) values
 Inflation and the mysterious UF, Corrugated City (a blog), 3 August 2007
 Shiller, Robert J. Indexed Units of Account: Theory and Assessment of Historical Experience

References 

Finance in Chile
Currency
Business in Chile
1967 establishments in Chile
Currencies introduced in 1967